The 2015–16 UEFA Europa League qualifying phase began on 30 June and ended on 6 August 2015. A total of 157 teams competed in the qualifying phase to decide which 44 teams would participate in the play-off round of the 2015–16 UEFA Europa League, the final round before the group stage.

All times were CEST (UTC+2).

Round and draw dates
All draws were held at UEFA headquarters in Nyon, Switzerland.

Matches could also be played on Tuesdays or Wednesdays instead of the regular Thursdays due to scheduling conflicts.

Format
In the qualifying phase and play-off round, each tie was played over two legs, with each team playing one leg at home. The team that scored more goals on aggregate over the two legs advanced to the next round. If the aggregate score was level, the away goals rule was applied, i.e., the team that scored more goals away from home over the two legs advanced. If away goals were also equal, then thirty minutes of extra time was played, divided into two fifteen-minutes halves. The away goals rule was again applied after extra time, i.e., if there were goals scored during extra time and the aggregate score was still level, the visiting team advanced by virtue of more away goals scored. If no goals were scored during extra time, the tie was decided by penalty shoot-out.

In the draws for each round, teams were seeded based on their UEFA club coefficients at the beginning of the season, with the teams divided into seeded and unseeded pots. A seeded team was drawn against an unseeded team, with the order of legs in each tie decided by draw. Due to the limited time between matches, the draws for the second and third qualifying rounds took place before the results of the previous round were known. For these draws (or in any cases where the result of a tie in the previous round was not known at the time of the draw), the seeding was carried out under the assumption that the team with the higher coefficient of an undecided tie advanced to this round, which means if the team with the lower coefficient was to advance, it simply took the seeding of its defeated opponent. Prior to the draws, UEFA formed "groups" in accordance with the principles set by the Club Competitions Committee, but they were purely for convenience of the draw and for ensuring that teams from the same association were not drawn against each other, and did not resemble any real groupings in the sense of the competition.

Teams
A total of 157 teams were involved in the qualifying phase and play-off round (including the 15 losers of the Champions League third qualifying round which entered the play-off round). The 22 winners of the play-off round advanced to the group stage to join the 16 teams which entered in the group stage and the 10 losers of the Champions League play-off round.

Below are the participating teams (with their 2015 UEFA club coefficients), grouped by their starting rounds.

Notes

First qualifying round

Seeding
A total of 102 teams played in the first qualifying round. The draw was held on 22 June 2015. (Note: The numbers for each team were pre-assigned by UEFA so that the draw could be held in one run for all groups with ten teams and another run for the group with twelve teams.)

Summary
The first legs were played on 30 June and 2 July, and the second legs were played on 7 and 9 July 2015.

|}

Notes

Matches

Koper won 3–2 on aggregate.

Odd won 3–0 on aggregate.

Kukësi won 2–0 on aggregate.

2–2 on aggregate. Alashkert won on away goals.

3–3 on aggregate. Jelgava won on away goals.

Newtown won 4–2 on aggregate.

Gabala won 3–2 on aggregate.

Dacia Chișinău won 5–1 on aggregate.

1–1 on aggregate. Spartak Trnava won on away goals.

West Ham United won 4–0 on aggregate.

Shakhtyor Soligorsk won 5–1 on aggregate.

Differdange 03 won 4–3 on aggregate.

1–1 on aggregate. Aberdeen won on away goals.

Rosenborg won 2–0 on aggregate.

FH won 2–0 on aggregate.

Linfield won 5–4 on aggregate.

Brøndby won 11–0 on aggregate.

Vojvodina won 3–1 on aggregate.

Skonto won 4–1 on aggregate.

Elfsborg won 7–2 on aggregate.

Beroe Stara Zagora won 5–1 on aggregate.

Debrecen won 3–2 on aggregate.

Beitar Jerusalem won 2–1 on aggregate.

Željezničar won 3–0 on aggregate.

Hajduk Split won 7–3 on aggregate.

Spartaks Jūrmala won 3–1 on aggregate.

Kairat won 4–1 on aggregate.

Rabotnički won 2–1 on aggregate.

Randers won 4–0 on aggregate.

Apollon Limassol won 4–0 on aggregate.

Shamrock Rovers won 3–0 on aggregate.

Nõmme Kalju won 1–0 on aggregate.

Omonia won 2–1 on aggregate.

Jagiellonia Białystok won 9–0 on aggregate.

Shirak won 3–2 on aggregate.

KR won 3–2 on aggregate.

Ferencváros won 5–2 on aggregate.

Trakai won 7–1 on aggregate.

1–1 on aggregate. Inter Baku won on away goals.

AIK won 6–2 on aggregate.

2–2 on aggregate. UCD won on away goals.

Čukarički won 1–0 on aggregate.

Žilina won 7–1 on aggregate.

Strømsgodset won 4–1 on aggregate.

3–3 on aggregate. Mladost Podgorica won on away goals.

Śląsk Wrocław won 4–1 on aggregate.

Vaduz won 10–1 on aggregate.

Birkirkara won 3–1 on aggregate.

Lokomotiva won 5–3 on aggregate.

Botoșani won 4–2 on aggregate.

Slovan Bratislava won 9–0 on aggregate.

Second qualifying round

Seeding
A total of 66 teams played in the second qualifying round: 15 teams which entered in this round, and the 51 winners of the first qualifying round. The draw was held on 22 June 2015. (Note: The numbers for each team were pre-assigned by UEFA so that the draw could be held in one run for all groups with 10 teams and another run for all groups with 12 teams.)

Notes

Summary
The first legs were played on 16 July, and the second legs were played on 21 and 23 July 2015.

|}

Matches

Kukësi won 4–3 on aggregate.

PAOK won 7–2 on aggregate.

Slovan Bratislava won 6–1 on aggregate.

Željezničar won 3–0 on aggregate.

Vaduz won 5–1 on aggregate.

Brøndby won 1–0 on aggregate.

Rosenborg won 4–0 on aggregate.

AIK won 4–0 on aggregate.

Legia Warsaw won 4–0 on aggregate.

Žilina won 6–3 on aggregate.

Odd won 4–1 on aggregate.

Thun won 3–2 on aggregate.

Kairat won 4–2 on aggregate.

Vojvodina won 4–1 on aggregate.

Omonia won 1–0 on aggregate.

Rabotnički won 2–1 on aggregate.

Gabala won 2–1 on aggregate.

Wolfsberger AC won 3–0 on aggregate.

Trabzonspor won 3–1 on aggregate.

Charleroi won 9–2 on aggregate.

Elfsborg won 1–0 on aggregate.

2–2 on aggregate. Strømsgodset won on away goals.

Dinamo Minsk won 5–1 on aggregate.

Aberdeen won 5–2 on aggregate.

1–1 on aggregate. West Ham United won 5–3 on penalties.

Apollon Limassol won 4–0 on aggregate.

Hajduk Split won 6–4 on aggregate.

Inter Baku won 4–3 on aggregate.

Astra Giurgiu won 1–0 on aggregate.

Spartak Trnava won 5–2 on aggregate.

Copenhagen won 5–1 on aggregate.

IFK Göteborg won 2–0 on aggregate.

Debrecen won 11–4 on aggregate.

Third qualifying round

Seeding
A total of 58 teams played in the third qualifying round: 25 teams which entered in this round, and the 33 winners of the second qualifying round. The draw was held on 17 July 2015. (Note: The numbers for each team were pre-assigned by UEFA so that the draw could be held in one run for the group with 10 teams and another run for all groups with 12 teams.)

Notes

Summary
The first legs were played on 29 and 30 July, and the second legs were played on 6 August 2015.

|}

Notes

Matches

Dinamo Minsk won 2–1 on aggregate.

Kairat won 3–2 on aggregate.

3–3 on aggregate. Žilina won on away goals.

AZ won 4–1 on aggregate.

Bordeaux won 4–0 on aggregate.

PAOK won 2–1 on aggregate.

Saint-Étienne won 4–2 on aggregate.

Rosenborg won 6–3 on aggregate.

3–3 on aggregate. Jablonec won on away goals.

2–2 on aggregate. Thun won on away goals.

Belenenses won 2–1 on aggregate.

Vojvodina won 4–2 on aggregate.

Legia Warsaw won 4–0 on aggregate.

Zorya Luhansk won 5–0 on aggregate.

Rubin Kazan won 4–3 on aggregate.

Odd won 3–2 on aggregate.

Southampton won 5–0 on aggregate.

Slovan Liberec won 5–1 on aggregate.

Gabala won 2–1 on aggregate.

Borussia Dortmund won 6–0 on aggregate.

Atromitos won 4–1 on aggregate.

Standard Liège won 3–1 on aggregate.

Astra Giurgiu won 4–3 on aggregate.

Athletic Bilbao won 2–0 on aggregate.

Rabotnički won 2–1 on aggregate.

2–2 on aggregate. Brøndby won on away goals.

Rheindorf Altach won 6–2 on aggregate.

Hajduk Split won 4–0 on aggregate.

Krasnodar won 5–3 on aggregate.

Statistics
There were 693 goals in 270 matches in the qualifying phase and play-off round, for an average of 2.57 goals per match.

Top goalscorers

Top assists

Notes

References

External links
2015–16 UEFA Europa League

1
June 2015 sports events in Europe
July 2015 sports events in Europe
August 2015 sports events in Europe
UEFA Europa League qualifying rounds